Moosa Manik (born 29 December 1963), best known as 'kuda moosa', is a football coach, and a former football player. He spent much of his youth playing football. He started his career as a footballer at the age of nineteen and continued to play for more than 20 years at the very top level. He played numerous positions during his career but more known as a gifted midfielder.

In 1984, he was named 'the most promising player of the year' and he was an automatic choice for the Maldives National team. Since then he appeared in the national team for more than a decade.

His life has been celebrated by football achievements rather than years. Year after year achievement after achievements his career ultimately led him to coach youngsters aspiring to become great football players.
He is widely regarded as one of the best coach in Maldives.

Clubs played (division 1)
1980 to 1992 and 2000–2001 New Radiant SC
1993 to 1996 Club Valencia (Maldives)
1997 to 1999 Hurriyya SC

Personal life
Moosa Manik has one Daughter and one Son. Muaan his Son, is currently playing for New Radiant SC.

Moosa Manik is the current head coach for MSM known as Maldives Soccer Mates.

Muan is also one of the head coaches in Maldives soca maites

Individual playing honors/tournaments

1980–2001 National football tournament and league (division 1)
1984		Most promising player, age under 21
1984		Best Midfield Player
1985		Best player
1985		Best Midfield Player
1986		Best player
1987		Best Forward
1988		Best player
1990		Best Forward
1991		Best player
1991		Best Forward
1993		Best Midfield Player
1990		Man of the tournament and fair player
1988–1992, 1994–1999 FA Cup
1989 	Best forward
1990	Fair Play
1991	Best scorer
1987–1999 President of Maldives Invitation Cup
1985, 1999–2000 Cup Winners Cup (Maldives)
2000 HAVEERU Footballer of the century
2016 founded Maldives soca Maites siuu #ronaldo cringe

International appearance

National Team Maldives
1984, 1985, 1987, 1989, 1992, 1999 	South Asian Federation Games
1984 Third Place
1992 Runner-Up
Captain National team
1989 	Best Forward
1985	Indian Ocean Island Games
1996	Asian Cup
1997	World Cup Qualifying

Club coaching and achievements

1985–1987 Young Star Sports Club (Maldives) – Division 3
1986 	Champions, Division 3 and qualified for Division 2
1987 	Champions, Division 2
1995 	Club Valencia Maldives – Division 1
1995	Champions, FA Cup
1996 	Orchid Sports Club – Division 2
1996	Champions, Division 2 and qualifies for Division 1
 2000–2003 	New Radiant Sports Club (Maldives) – Division 	1
2000	Champions, Cup Winners Cup
2000	Champions, Malé League
2001 	Champions, Football Association Cup
2003 	Champions, Cup Winners Cup
1997–1999, 2004	Hurriya Sports Club (Maldives) Division 1
1999	Champions of the President of Maldives Invitation Cup
1999	Champions Maldives League

National team Coaching
1990 Assistant coach for Maldives National Youth Team (U-19)
1991 Assistant coach for Maldives National Youth Team (U-23) for Olympic Qualifying
2002 Coach for Maldives National Youth Team (U-20) for AFC U-20 qualifying
2005 Coach for Maldives National Youth Team (U-20)
2006 Assistant coach for the Maldives National Team (U-23) for SAF Games (Sri Lanka)
2006 Assistant coach for the Maldives National Team (U-23) for Asian Games (Doha)
2011 Assistant coach for the Maldives National Team For SAF Championship

External links

AFC
FIFA.com 

1964 births
Living people
Maldivian footballers
Maldives international footballers
New Radiant S.C. players
Club Valencia players
People from Malé
Maldivian football managers
Association footballers not categorized by position
South Asian Games medalists in football